Trilogy Tower, was a commercial development proposed in Brisbane, Australia located at 480 Queen Street. Trilogy Tower was expected to be Brisbane's second tallest building (255 m) after Vision Brisbane (283 m, also cancelled). The tower was to feature 30,000m² of commercial office space, 192 one and two bedroom hotel apartments, and 109 single and double story residential apartments. The tower's name was derived from these three components.

The tower was designed by Cottee Parker Architects, who have also designed many completed and proposed Brisbane buildings such as Aurora Tower, Felix Tower and Evolution. The companies behind Trilogy Tower were APH Capital Partners (APH), a multi-award-winning Brisbane developer along with the Contractor Laing O'Rourke.

At the top of the building a large, solar-powered lamp visible from across the city was planned.

Construction
The site was purchased from the Australian Red Cross in July, 2006 for A$32 million. The total cost of Trilogy Tower was projected to be A$980 million.

Demolition of the buildings on the site was completed 2008. The office floors were expected to open in 2011 before the rest of the building could be completed in the following year. This part of the building was planned to sold by APH as a complete package for around A$300 million, however the global credit crisis was blamed for its failure to sell.
In April 2011 the site was bought by Grocon who was planning to construct a 37-storey commercial office tower.

See also

List of tallest buildings in Australia
List of tallest buildings in Brisbane
List of tallest buildings and structures in Australia

References

External links 
 
 
 APH properties Official website
 Trilogy Tower discussion forum

Skyscrapers in Brisbane
Unbuilt buildings and structures in Australia